Figaro Nunatak is an isolated nunatak rising to about  near the east end of Mozart Ice Piedmont, in the northern part of Alexander Island, Antarctica. It was mapped from air photos taken by the Ronne Antarctic Research Expedition, 1947–48, by D. Searle of the Falkland Islands Dependencies Survey in 1960, and was named by the UK Antarctic Place-Names Committee from association with the Mozart Ice Piedmont after Mozart's opera The Marriage of Figaro, composed in 1786.

See also

 Gannon Nunataks
 Hyperion Nunataks
 Stephenson Nunatak

References 

Nunataks of Alexander Island
Cultural depictions of Wolfgang Amadeus Mozart